Takafumi Okubo (born 1 January 1942) is a Japanese sailor. He competed in the Star event at the 1964 Summer Olympics.

References

External links
 

1942 births
Living people
Japanese male sailors (sport)
Olympic sailors of Japan
Sailors at the 1964 Summer Olympics – Star
Place of birth missing (living people)